Lewis T. Mittness, Jr. was a former member of the Wisconsin State Assembly.

Biography
Mittness was born on July 29, 1929, in La Crosse, Wisconsin. He graduated from high school in Tomah, Wisconsin before attending the University of Wisconsin–La Crosse. He then received his bachelor's degree from the University of Wisconsin–Stevens Point and his master's degree from the University of Wisconsin–Madison. During the Korean War, he served in the United States Army. Mittness was in the real estate business. He resigned from the Assembly to become executive secretary of the Wisconsin Public Service Commission serving from 1975 to 1980. He then served as sergeant at arms in the Wisconsin Assembly from 1981 to 1984. He died in Janesville, Wisconsin on May 27, 2006.

Political career
Mittness was a member of the Assembly from 1965 to 1975. He was a Democrat.

References

1929 births
2006 deaths
20th-century American politicians
Businesspeople from Wisconsin
Democratic Party members of the Wisconsin State Assembly
Employees of the Wisconsin Legislature
Politicians from La Crosse, Wisconsin
People from Tomah, Wisconsin
Military personnel from Wisconsin
United States Army soldiers
United States Army personnel of the Korean War
University of Wisconsin–La Crosse alumni
University of Wisconsin–Stevens Point alumni
University of Wisconsin–Madison alumni
People from Janesville, Wisconsin
20th-century American businesspeople